The Democratic Party of South Tyrol (DPS) was a minor regionalist liberal, green and social-democratic political party active in South Tyrol, Italy. It was a left-wing alternative to the dominant South Tyrolean People's Party.

The party was founded in 1997, as a continuation of the Social Democratic Party of South Tyrol, and was led by Roland Girardi.

In the 1998 provincial election the DPS formed a joint list with the Ladins Political Movement, while five years later it supported the Greens.

In 2008 most Democrats joined the Greens.

External links
Official website

References

Political parties in South Tyrol
Political parties established in 1997
Political parties with year of disestablishment missing